Perrott Lyon Timlock & Kesa was an Australian architecture firm based in Melbourne, formed in 1970, from Leslie M Perrott & Partners, and which became Perrott Lyon Mathieson in 1976. They are best known for Nauru House at 80 Collins Street, briefly Australia's tallest. In 1973 they won a Victorian Architecture Medal Award of Merit for their MMBW House in Melbourne.

Buildings
 Nauru House, Melbourne, 1972-1977 
 Melbourne and Metropolitan Board of Works (MMBW House), Melbourne, 1976 
 Ansett House, Swanston Street, 1976-1978.

References 

Architecture firms of Australia
Architecture firms based in Victoria (Australia)
1970 establishments in Australia
1976 disestablishments in Australia
Companies based in Melbourne